The Fire Pony is a children's novel written by Rodman Philbrick, first published in the United States in 1996 by Blue Sky Press. It is titled Fire Pony in the UK, where it was first published in 2005 by Usborne Publishing.

Plot summary
11-year-old Roy and his big brother, Joe, are on the run from the authorities when they fetch up at the Bar None ranch. Their shared passion for horses soon wins them great respect, and Roy is offered the chance of a lifetime, to break in a wild pony that runs like the desert wind. He is even promised that if he can ride Lady Luck, he can keep her – a dream come true.

But Roy knows that Joe has a dangerous secret... a dark obsession that could explode at any time and send Roy's dream, and their whole world, up in smoke.

List of characters
Roy: The protagonist and narrator
Joe-Dilly: Roy's older "brother", who loves horses but has a dark obsession
Nick Jessup: Owner of Bar None ranch
Rick Valdez: Jessup's foreman, who looks Mexican but was born on the ranch
Mr. Molton T. Mullins: A rider that Roy races against, who owns a ranch that borders the Bar None ranch

The horses
Lady Luck: A horse that Roy trains and rides in a race
Showdown: A crazy horse which Joe must train
Pit Stop: Mr. Jessup's horse

1996 American novels
American children's novels
Novels about horses
Children's novels about animals
1996 children's books
Blue Sky Press books